Eli Rygg (born 22 September 1955) is a Norwegian television personality and children's writer.

She grew up in Veblungsnes and moved to Levanger at the age of 12. She attended folk high school in Skogn and Inderøy. She had a daughter as a teenager (in 1973), and studied domestic science and childcare in Skatval, and thereafter found work in Stjørdal. In 1985 she moved to Oslo as she was drafted by the Norwegian Broadcasting Corporation to star in the children's television show Portveien 2. In 1987 she was awarded the Se og Hør readers' TV personality of the year award.

She later hosted Teodors julekalender and Frokost-TV on NRK1, Barn ingen hindring on NRK2 and the radio show Revehiet on P4 Radio Hele Norge. She has written several children's books, and has read fairytales for a live audience, among others with backing by Concerts Norway.

She resides in Son.

References

1955 births
Living people
People from Levanger
Norwegian television presenters
NRK people
Norwegian radio personalities
Norwegian children's writers